XLM may refer to:
 
   Stellar Lumens cryptocurrency 
  Microsoft Excel  macro
  Xen Loadable Module

See also
 XML
 XL (disambiguation)